Metro M1 may refer to :

Bucharest Metro Line M1
M1 (Copenhagen)
M1 (Istanbul Metro)
Metro M1 (Prague)
Milan Metro Line 1